Kirkland's, Inc. is an American retail chain that sells home decor, furniture, textiles, accessories and gifts. It operates 361 stores in 35 states as well as an e-commerce enabled website. It is based in Brentwood, TN.

History

Kirkland's was founded by Carl Kirkland and Robert Kirkland in 1966 in Jackson, Tennessee, when they began selling home accessories at low prices. As of September 2018, the chain has grown to 431 stores in 37 states.

In September 2018, Kirkland's announced it had named Steve Woodward as the new CEO, replacing interim CEO, Mike Cairnes. Co-founder Robert Kirkland was also the main funder for nationally acclaimed museum and fun park, Discovery Park of America, located in Union City, Tennessee.

Philanthropy
Each year, Kirkland's hosts events and special promotions in benefit of Camp Charley, a camp for critically ill children in Scottsville, Kentucky. Kirkland's past philanthropic projects also include participation in ABC's Extreme Makeover: Home Edition and the American Cancer Society Relay for Life, as well as promotion of a holiday-themed music CD in benefit of Habitat for Humanity.

Restatement
On March 17, 2005, the company said quarterly profit fell, and it would restate prior period financial statements to reflect corrections to its lease-related accounting.

References

External links
 

Companies based in Nashville, Tennessee
Furniture retailers of the United States
Home decor retailers
American companies established in 1966
Retail companies established in 1966
1966 establishments in Tennessee
Companies listed on the Nasdaq
Jackson, Tennessee
Online retailers of the United States